The German city of Cologne was founded in the 1st century as the Roman Colonia Claudia Ara Agrippinensium. 
It was taken by the Franks in the 5th century and became an important city of Medieval Germany, the seat of an Archbishop and a Prince-Elector. As the Free Imperial City of Cologne it was one of the centers of the Hanseatic League in the early modern period.

Most of the city was destroyed in the bombing of Cologne in World War II, so it was of limited importance in post-war West Germany. It had returned to its pre-war population by 1959, by which time Düsseldorf was the political center of the state of North Rhine-Westphalia, and Bonn was the (provisional) capital of the Federal Republic. In the late 20th century, Cologne grew into a center of the sprawling Rhine-Ruhr metropolitan area, with some 12 million inhabitants, just over one million of whom live in Cologne proper (as of 2012), making the city the fourth largest in Germany (after Berlin, Hamburg and Munich).

Early history

Roman period 

In 39 BC the Germanic tribe of the Ubii entered into an agreement with the forces of the Roman General Marcus Vipsanius Agrippa and settled on the left bank of the Rhine. Their headquarters was Oppidum Ubiorum (settlement of the Ubii) and at the same time an important Roman military base. In 50 AD the Cologne-born Agrippina the Younger, wife of the Emperor Claudius, asked for her home village to be raised to the status of a colonia — a city under Roman law. It was then renamed Colonia Claudia Ara Agrippinensis (colony of Claudius and the altar of Agrippina), shortened to Colonia Agrippina (Colony of Agrippina). In 80 AD the Eifel Aqueduct was built. It was one of the longest aqueducts of the Roman Empire, delivering 20,000 cubic metres of water to the city every day. Ten years later, the colonia became the capital of the Roman province of Lower Germany, Germania Inferior, with a total population of 45,000 people occupying 96.8 hectares.

In 260 AD Postumus made Cologne the capital of the Gallic Empire, which included the Gallic provinces, the German provinces to the left of the Rhine, Britannia, and the provinces of Hispania. The Gallic Empire lasted only fourteen years.

By the 3rd century, only some 20,000 people lived in and around the town. In 310 AD, Emperor Constantine I had a bridge constructed over the Rhine, guarded by the castellum Divitia. Divitia later became a part of Cologne with the name Deutz.

The presence of Jews in Cologne was documented in AD 321. When exactly the first Jews arrived in the Rhineland area cannot now be established, but the Cologne community claims to be the oldest north of the Alps. As early as 321 AD, an edict by the Emperor Constantine allowed Jews to be elected to the City Council.

Frankish rule 

Colonia was pillaged several times by the Franks in the 4th century. Two lavish burial sites located near the Cathedral date from this period. In 355 AD the Alemanni tribes besieged the town for 10 months, finally taking and plundering it. At the time, the garrison of Colonia Agrippina was under the generalship of Marcus Vitellus. The Romans re-occupied the city several months afterwards by Julian. The city finally fell to the Ripuarian Franks in 462 AD.

Cologne served as a base for the Carolingian conversion of the Saxons and Frisians. In 795 the chaplain to Charlemagne, Hildebold, was elevated to the newly created archbishopric of Cologne. After the death of Charlemagne, Cologne became part of Middle Francia. Archbishop Gunther was excommunicated in 863 for his support of the divorce and remarriage of Lothair II. In 873 Gunther's successor Wilbert consecrated what would become known as the Alter Dom (old cathedral), the predecessor of Cologne Cathedral. With the death of Lothair in 876, Cologne fell to East Francia under Louis the German. The city was burnt down by Vikings in the winter of 881/2.

In the early 10th century, the dukes of Lorraine seceded from East Francia. Cologne passed to East Francia but was soon reconquered by Henry the Fowler, deciding its fate as a city of the Holy Roman Empire (and eventually Germany) rather than France.

Cologne in the Holy Roman Empire

Later Middle Ages
Cologne's first Christian bishop was Maternus. He was responsible for the construction of the first cathedral, a square building erected early in the 4th century. In 794, Hildebald (or Hildebold) was the first Bishop of Cologne to be appointed archbishop. Bruno I (925–965), younger brother of Otto I, Holy Roman Emperor, founded several monasteries here.

The dynasty of the Ezzonids, later Counts of Berg, counted 7 archbishops during that period and consolidated the powers of the archbishopric over imperial affairs. The archbishops of Cologne became very influential as advisers to the Saxon, Salian and Hohenstaufen dynasties. From 1031 they also held the office of Arch-Chancellor of Italy. Their authority culminated under Archbishop Engelbert II of Berg, imperial administrator (Reichsprovisor) and tutor to the emperor's son. Between 1216 and 1225, Engelbert fought for the establishment and security of the archdiocese of Cologne both as an ecclesiastical authority and as a secular territory. This led to his murder in 1225.

Construction of the Gothic cathedral started in 1248 under Konrad von Hochstaden. The eastern arm was completed and consecrated in 1322. Construction of the western arm was halted in 1475, and it would remain unfinished until 1880.

In 1074 the commune was formed. By the 13th century, the relationship between the city and its archbishop had become difficult, and after the Battle of Worringen in 1288, the forces of Brabant and the citizenry of Cologne captured Archbishop Siegfried of Westerburg (1274–97), resulting in almost complete freedom for the city. To regain his liberty the archbishop recognized the political independence of Cologne but reserved certain rights, notably the administration of justice.

Cologne effectively became a free city after 1288, and in 1475 it was formally made a free imperial city, a status that it held until annexed by France on May 28, 1796. The Archbishopric of Cologne was a state in its own right within the Holy Roman Empire, but the city was independent, and the archbishops were usually not allowed to enter it. Instead, they took up residence in Bonn and later in Brühl until they returned in 1821. From 1583 to 1761, all ruling archbishops came from the Wittelsbach dynasty. As powerful electors, the archbishops repeatedly challenged Cologne's free status during the 17th and 18th centuries, resulting in complicated legal affairs, which were handled by diplomatic means, usually to the advantage of the city.

The first pogrom against the Jews of Cologne occurred in 1349, when they were used as scapegoats for the Black Death. In 1424 they were evicted from the city. They were allowed back again in 1798.

Early modern period

The most significant issue in Cologne for much of the early modern period was whether to join the Reformation, particularly the Reformed strand of Protestantism that had become established in nearby Strasbourg. The long-serving Archbishop Hermann von Wied was interested in reforming Cologne's churches and invited Martin Bucer to lead the process in 1542. Both Bucer and von Wied were expelled by Imperial armies under Charles V. In 1582, Archbishop Gebhard Truchsess von Waldburg converted to the Reformed faith and attempted to reform practices in the city's churches. This was violently opposed by the Wittelsbachs, leading to the Cologne War. The city's population, following the lead of the cathedral clergy, generally preferred the influence of the Pope in Rome to the Archbishop on their doorstep and so the city was spared the worst of the devastation inflicted on the surrounding towns and countryside.

In the period of the persecution of witches (1435–1655), 37 people were executed in Cologne, mostly during the reign of Archbishop Ferdinand of Bavaria in the years 1626 to 1631. One of those executed was Katharina Henot, the first known female postmaster of Germany and an influential citizen. She apparently fell victim to a conspiracy of her enemies among the city authorities after proceedings which were flawed according to the laws of the period.

Long-distance trade in the Baltic intensified as the major trading towns came together in the Hanseatic League under the leadership of Lübeck. The League was a business alliance of trading cities and their guilds that dominated trade along the coast of Northern Europe. It flourished from the 1200 to 1500 and continued with lesser importance thereafter. The chief cities were Cologne on the Rhine, Hamburg and Bremen on the North Sea, and Lübeck on the Baltic. Cologne was a leading member, especially because of its trade with England. The Hanseatic League gave merchants special privileges in member cities, which dominated trade in the Baltic Sea and the North Sea. Cologne's hinterland in Germany gave it an added advantage over the other Hanseatic cities, and it became the largest city in Germany and the region. Cologne's central location on the Rhine placed it at the intersection of the major trade routes between east and west and was the basis of Cologne's growth. The economic structures of medieval and early modern Cologne were based on the city's major harbor, its location as a transport hub, and its entrepreneurial merchants who built ties with merchants in other Hanseatic cities.

Cologne Cathedral housed sacred relics that made it a destination for many worshippers. With the bishop not resident, the city was ruled by patricians (merchants carrying on long-distance trade). The craftsmen formed guilds, which sought to obtain control of the towns. The guilds were governed by strict rules. A few were open to women. Society was divided into sharply demarcated classes: the clergy, physicians, merchants, and various guilds of artisans; full citizenship was not available to paupers. Political tensions arose from issues of taxation, public spending, regulation of business, and market supervision, as well as the limits of corporate autonomy.

Modern history

Napoleonic and Prussian period 

The French Revolutionary Wars resulted in the occupation of Cologne and the Rhineland in 1794. In the following years the French consolidated their presence. In 1798 the city became an arrondissement in the newly created Département de la Roer. In the same year the University of Cologne was closed. In 1801 all citizens of Cologne were granted French citizenship. In 1804 Napoléon Bonaparte visited the city together with his wife Joséphine de Beauharnais. The French occupation ended in 1814, when Cologne was occupied by Prussian and Russian troops. In 1815 Cologne and the Rhineland were allocated to Prussia.

Weimar Republic 
From the end of World War I until 1926, Cologne was occupied by the British Army of the Rhine under the terms of the armistice and the subsequent Peace Treaty of Versailles.

In contrast to the harsh measures taken by French occupation troops, the British acted with more tact towards the local population. Konrad Adenauer, mayor of Cologne from 1917 until 1933 and a future West German chancellor, acknowledged the political impact of this approach, especially that the British opposed French plans for a permanent Allied occupation of the Rhineland.

The demilitarization of the Rhineland required the fortifications to be dismantled. This was taken as an opportunity to create two green belts (Grüngürtel) around the city by converting the fortifications and their surroundings, which had been kept clear for artillery, into large public parks. This project was completed in 1933.

In 1919 Cologne University, closed by the French in 1798, was founded anew. It was considered a substitute for the German University of Strasbourg, which became part of France along with the rest of Alsace. Cologne prospered during the Weimar Republic and progress was made especially in governance, city planning and social affairs. Social housing projects were considered exemplary and were copied by other German cities.

As Cologne competed to host the Olympics, a modern sports stadium was erected at Müngersdorf. Early in the 1920s civil aviation was permitted once more, and Cologne Butzweilerhof Airport soon became a hub for national and international air traffic, second in Germany only to Berlin Tempelhof Airport.

Nazi Germany 
At the beginning of Nazi Germany, Cologne was considered difficult by the Nazis because of deep-rooted communist and Catholic influences in the city. The Nazis were always struggling for control of the city.

Local elections on 13 March 1933 resulted in the Nazi Party winning 39.6% of the vote, followed by the catholic Zentrum Party with 28.3%, the Social Democratic Party of Germany with 13.2%, and the Communist Party of Germany with 11.1%. One day later, on 14 March, Nazi followers occupied the city hall and took over government. Communist and Social Democratic members of the city assembly were imprisoned, and Mayor Adenauer was dismissed.

When the Nazis came to power in 1933, the Jewish population of Cologne was about 20,000. By 1939, 40% of the city's Jews had emigrated. The vast majority of those who remained had been deported to concentration camps by 1941. The trade fair grounds next to the Deutz train station were used to herd the Jewish population together for deportation to the death camps and for disposal of their household goods by public sale. On Kristallnacht in 1938, Cologne's synagogues were desecrated or set on fire.

It was planned to rebuild a large part of the inner city, with a main road connecting the Deutz station and the main station, which was to be moved from next to the cathedral to an area adjacent to today's university campus, with a huge field for rallies, the Maifeld, next to the main station. The Maifeld, between the campus and the Aachener Weiher artificial lake, was the only part of this over-ambitious plan to be realized before the start of the war. After the war, the remains of the Maifeld were buried with rubble from bombed buildings and turned into a park with rolling hills, which was christened Hiroshima-Nagasaki-Park in August 2004 as a memorial to the victims of the nuclear bombs of 1945. An inconspicuous memorial to the victims of the Nazi regime is situated on one of the hills.

On the night of 30–31 May 1942, Cologne was the target for the first 1,000 bomber raid of the war. Between 469 and 486 people, around 90% of them civilians, were reported killed, more than 5,000 were injured, and more than 45,000 lost their homes. It was estimated that up to 150,000 of Cologne's population of around 700,000 left the city after the raid. The Royal Air Force lost 43 of the 1,103 bombers sent. By the end of World War II, 90% of Cologne's buildings had been destroyed by Allied aerial bombing raids, most of them flown by the RAF.

On 10 November 1944, a dozen members of the anti-Nazi Ehrenfeld Group were hanged in public. Six of them were 16-year-old boys of the Edelweiss Pirates youth gang, including Barthel Schink; Fritz Theilen survived.

The bombings continued and people moved out. By May 1945 only 20,000 residents remained out of 770,000.

The outskirts of Cologne were reached by US troops on 4 March 1945. The inner city on the left bank of the Rhine was captured in half a day on 6 March 1945, meeting only minor resistance. Because the Hohenzollernbrücke was destroyed by retreating German pioneers, the boroughs on the right bank remained under German control until mid-April 1945.

Postwar Cologne 
Although Cologne was larger than its neighbors, Düsseldorf was chosen as the political capital of the newly established Federal State of North Rhine-Westphalia, and Bonn as the (provisional) capital of the Federal Republic. Cologne benefited from being sandwiched between the two important political centers of West Germany by becoming home to a large number of federal agencies and organizations. After reunification in 1990, a new situation has been politically co-ordinated with the new federal capital, Berlin.

In 1945 architect and urban planner Rudolf Schwarz called Cologne the "world's greatest heap of debris". Schwarz designed the 1947 reconstruction master plan, which called for the construction of several new thoroughfares through the downtown area, especially the Nord-Süd-Fahrt (North-South-Drive). The plan took into consideration that even shortly after the war a large increase in automobile traffic could be anticipated. Plans for new roads had already evolved to some extent under the Nazi administration, but construction became easier now that the majority of downtown lots were undeveloped. The destruction of the famous twelve Romanesque churches, including St. Gereon's Basilica, Great St. Martin, St. Maria im Kapitol and about a dozen others during World War II, meant a tremendous loss of cultural substance to the city. The rebuilding of these churches and other landmarks like the Gürzenich was not undisputed among leading architects and art historians at that time, but in most cases, civil intention prevailed. The reconstruction lasted until the 1990s, when the Romanesque church of St. Kunibert was finished.

It took some time to rebuild the city. In 1959 the city's population reached pre-war numbers again. Afterwards the city grew steadily, and in 1975 the number exceeded one million inhabitants for about a year. The population stayed just below a million for the next 35 years, before again surpassing the million inhabitant mark in 2010.

In the 1980s and 1990s Cologne's economy prospered from two factors. First, the steady growth in the number of media companies in both the private and the public sector. Catering especially to these companies is the newly developed Media Park, which creates a strongly visual focal point in downtown Cologne and includes the KölnTurm (Cologne Tower), one of Cologne's most prominent highrises. Secondly, a permanent improvement in traffic infrastructure, which makes Cologne one of the most easily accessible metropolitan areas in Central Europe.

Due to the economic success of the Cologne Trade Fair, the city arranged a large extension to the fair site in 2005. The original buildings, which date back to the 1920s, are rented out to RTL, Germany's largest private broadcaster, as their new corporate headquarters.

Cologne was at the centre of the 2015-16 New Year's Eve sexual assaults in Germany. A controversy started after Muslims in Cologne sought to build the Cologne Central Mosque, which was completed in 2017.

Most important for the history of Cologne since the Middle Ages is the Cologne City Archive, which was the largest in Germany. Its building collapsed during the construction of an extension to the underground railway system on 3 March 2009.

See also 
 Timeline of Cologne
 Coat of arms of Cologne
 History of the Jews in Cologne

References

Further reading

External links 

Edicts of the "Kurfürstentum" of Cologne, 1461–1816 online
 Map of the Archbishopric of Cologne in 1789
 Colonia Agrippina (Present-Day Cologne) Accurately Described in the Year 1571
 Cologne History Society
 Edicts of the Electorate of Cologne (with the Duchy of Westphalia and Vest Recklinghausen) (1461–1816) (Slg. Scotti online)
 Statutes of the city of Cologne – manuscripts from the mid-15th century
 Deed of the city of Cologne (Bürgermeister and Schöffen) from 1159, with city seal, 
 Comprehensive description of the history of the city
 Nazi documentation centre for the city of Cologne
 Landschaftsverband Rheinland: Portal Rheinische Geschichte